Held every two years, the Western Coatings Symposium and Show serves the people and businesses that formulate and manufacture coatings in Western USA and Canada.  Attendees learn the newest technical trends and advancements in coatings formulating, as well as develop an expanded network of key technical contacts in the industry.

The Western Coatings Symposium and Show is organized by the Los Angeles Society for Coatings Technology (LASCT), the Pacific Northwest Society for Coatings Technology (PNWSCT),  the Golden Gate Society for Coatings Technology (GGSCT) and the Arizona Society for Coatings Technology (ASCT).  The primary mandate of these four organizations is to:

 Provide educational and networking opportunities for the members
 Award scholarships/grants to students and academic institutions predominantly focused on coatings research or related fields of study.

Western Coatings Societies Mission Statement 

The primary mission of the Western Coating Societies (WCS) is to promote education activities and the interchange of ideas among its members and the public and to arrange for the collection and dissemination of information pertinent to the industries served by WCS, .including but not limited to paints, coatings, inks, adhesives, varnishes, and other related fields.

History of the WCS 

In the early 1950s, three groups known as the Golden Gate Paint and Varnish Production Club, the Los Angeles Paint and Varnish Production Club, and the Pacific Northwest Paint and Varnish Production Club collaborated to bring a national coatings symposium to the west coast, for the purpose of providing technical education and network opportunities to individuals associated with west coast paint companies that were not able to attend the coating's conferences being held in the Midwest or on the east coast. At that time it was decided that the west coast symposium would be held on a biennial basis, rotating between the cities of Los Angeles and San Francisco with the Los Angeles Club and Golden Gate Club as hosts, respectively, and that a trade show would be included, running concurrent with the symposium.

The First Symposium 

The first symposium and show was held in the spring of 1952 at the Biltmore Hotel in Los Angeles. The event was titled the "Pacific Coast Production Clubs Symposium with Paint Materials and Equipment Show". The second symposium and show was held in the spring of 1954 at the Fairmont Hotel in San Francisco.

After the 1954 symposium and show, the Golden Gate, Los Angeles, and Pacific Northwest Clubs began meeting annually during the summer, in what was termed the "Joint Executive Meeting", to exchange ideas relative to the Clubs and discuss past and future symposiums. In the 1960s the Clubs changed their names to Golden Gate, Los Angeles, and Pacific Northwest Society for Coatings Technology, the annual summer meeting became the West Coast Societies Annual Meeting, and the Western Coatings Society for Coatings Technology (WCS) was born. The Rocky Mountain Society for Coatings Technology joined the WCS group in 1961, but unfortunately had to withdraw in 2006 due to low membership and participation within their society. The Arizona Society for Coatings Technology expressed interest in joining the WCS in 2004 and they were welcomed into the WCS in 2005.

The WCS Symposium and Show continued to be held in even years on a biennial basis, rotating between Southern California and Northern California, until 1976 when the symposium was moved to the spring of 1977 due to the Federation of Societies for Coatings Technology (FSCT) (currently the American Coatings Association, ACA) annual International Coatings Exposition (ICE) convention and paint show that was held in the fall of 1975 in Los Angeles. The WCS Symposium and Show has been held on a biennial basis on odd years ever since.

During the winter of 1999, the Golden Gate Society moved the WCS Symposium from Northern California to Sparks, Nevada due to the exorbitant expense of holding the symposium in San Francisco. An additional change to the symposium and show was the implementation of table top exhibits instead of full booth exhibit space. The symposium and show was held in Los Angeles in 2001 and this was the last WCS symposium to take place in Los Angeles and in California. The WCS Symposium and show returned to Reno during the winter of 2003.

A Bright Future 

At the 2002 West Coast Societies Annual Meeting it was decided to change the rotating venue format of the symposium to the permanent neutral location of Las Vegas.  In the fall of 2005, the WCS Symposium and Show moved to its new home city of Las Vegas, Nevada.  The WCS incorporated in 2006 and currently consists of the Arizona, Golden Gate, Los Angeles, and Pacific Northwest Societies for Coatings Technology.

References

 http://www.pcimag.com/articles/98296-western-coatings-symposium-and-show-slated-for-october
 http://www.pcimag.com/articles/92281-western-coatings-symposium-seeks-technical-presentations-1
 http://www.pcimag.com/articles/89869-dow-coating-materials-introduces-innovations-at-symposium
 http://www.pcimag.com/articles/101367-western-coatings-show-registers-15-growth
 http://www.pcimag.com/articles/86938-the-2007-western-coatings-societies-show-announced-1
 https://10times.com/wcs-las-vegas
 http://www.adhesivesmag.com/events/1245-western-coatings-societies-symposium-and-show
 http://www.coatingsworld.com/issues/1213/view_features/western-coatings-symposium-review/7877

External links 
 Western Coatings Symposium Home Page

Technology conferences
Paint and coatings industry